The St. Ursula's Church is a Roman Catholic church in Kouvola, Finland. The congregation was founded in 1985, and at first the masses were celebrated in an apartment. The current church was inaugurated on December 11, 1993. It was designed by architect Benito Casagrande. The congregation got support for the church project from German Catholics. The current priest of the congregation is Father Jean Claude Kabeza.

See also
Roman Catholicism in Finland
St. Henry's Cathedral

References

Buildings and structures in Kouvola
Roman Catholic churches completed in 1993
20th-century Roman Catholic church buildings in Finland